Sandra Hill may refer to:

Sandy Hill (television personality) (born 1947), American broadcast journalist
Sandy Hill (mountaineer) (born 1955), American author
Sandra Hill (footballer) (born 1998), Cambodian futsal player

See also
San Hill, character in List of Star Wars species (K–O)
Sand Hill (disambiguation)
Sandy Hill (disambiguation)